Balaji Telefilms is an Indian television producing house company. The company was founded by Ekta Kapoor and Shobha Kapoor in 1994, in Mumbai, Maharastra, India. It specializes in and Indian soap operas, fiction programming and reality television. In 2001, Balaji Telefilms expanded into film production as well as distribution.

Due to the release of fictional programming and its reception, Balaji Telefilms became a contender for major awards. In 2002, Balaji Telefilms became the first Indian television production company to earned major awards and nominations at Indian Telly Awards and Indian Television Academy Awards. Also Kyunki Saas Bhi Kabhi Bahu Thi became the first only television program to win the first ever Indian Television Academy Award for Best TV Show (Fiction) its protagonists, Smriti Irani and Amar Upadhyay became first actors to win The Television Academy Award.

International Awards

Indian Telly Awards

The Indian Telly Awards are annual honours presented by the media firm IndianTelevision.com. The awards are given in several categories such as best program or series in a specific genre, best television channel in a particular category, most popular actors and awards for technical roles such as writers and directors.

The last ceremony was held in 2019 where the Balaji Telefilms won 6 awards.

Indian Television Academy Awards

The Indian Television Academy Awards are annual awards presented by the Indian Television Academy. The awards are given to various artists, technicians and crew members.

The last ceremony was held in 2019 where the drama series by Balaji Telefilms won 4 awards including Best Actress - Drama,  Best Actor - Popular
and Best Serial - Popular.

Gold Awards
The Gold Awards are annual honors presented by Zee TV in association with White Leaf Entertainment. The awards are awarded in several categories to the best performers on Indian television, which includes cast and technical crew.

The last ceremony was held in 2019 where the Balaji Telefilms won a whopping 14 awards including Gold Award for Best Television Show (Fiction) for Kundali Bhagya.

Zee Rishtey Awards
The Zee Rishtey Awards are annual honours presented by Zee Entertainment Enterprises to the actors and shows aired on Zee TV in various popular categories.

The last ceremony was held in 2019, where Kumkum Bhagya and Kundali Bhagya won a whopping 14 awards.

References

Balaji Telefilms
Balaji Telefilms
India
Awards